Neonatal hypoglycemia occurs when the neonate's blood glucose level is less than the newborn's body requirements for factors such as cellular energy and metabolism. There is inconsistency internationally for diagnostic thresholds. In the US, hypoglycemia is when the blood glucose level is below 30 mg/dL within the first 24 hours of life and below 45 mg/dL thereafter. In the UK, however, lower and more variable thresholds are used (<18 mg/dL at any time OR baby with abnormal clinical signs and a single value <45 mg/dL OR baby at risk of impaired metabolic adaptation but without abnormal clinical signs and a measurement <36 mg/dL and remaining <36 mg/dL at next measurement). The neonate's gestational age, birth weight, metabolic needs, and wellness state of the newborn has a substantial impact on the neonates blood glucose level. There are known risk factors that can be both maternal and neonatal. This is a treatable condition. Its treatment depends on the cause of the hypoglycemia. Though it is treatable, it can be fatal if gone undetected.  Hypoglycemia is the most common metabolic problem in newborns.

Neonatal hypoglycemia occurs in between 1 in 3 births out of every 1,000 births but is hard to quantify internationally due to lack of consensus about diagnostic thresholds. It often occurs in premature babies, small full-term babies, babies of diabetic mothers, and is more common in neonatal hypoxic asphyxia, sclerosis, and infected sepsis. Severe hypoglycaemia with persistent or repeated episodes can cause damage to the central nervous system. Neonatal hypoglycaemia can be a stand-alone condition or a clinical manifestation of other conditions.

Signs and symptoms
The way in which neonatal hypoglycemia symptoms may be presented is vague or hard to tell apart from other conditions. The symptoms can be confused with:
 hypocalcemia
 Sepsis
 CNS disorders
 Cardiorespiratory problems

Neonatal hypoglycemia can also show no symptoms in some newborns or may be life-threatening.

Some observed symptoms are (these symptoms may be transient but reoccurring):
 Jitteriness
 hypothermia 
 irritability 
 pallor 
 tremors
 twitching
 weak or high pitched cry
 lethargy
 hypotonia
 generalized seizures
 coma
 cyanosis
 apnea
 rapid and irregular respirations
 diaphoresis
 eye rolling
 refusal to feed
 hunger

Causes

Risk Factors

Mother 
Risk factors in the mother that increased the risk of developing hypoglycemia shortly after birth include:
 Type 1 diabetes
 Gestational diabetes mellitus (Transient)
 Intrapartum glucose administration (Transient)
 Gestational hypertension
 Preeclampsia
 Terbutaline administration (Transient)
 Intrauterine growth restriction (Transient)
 Perinatal stress or asphyxia (Transient)

Baby 

Babies which have an increased risk of developing hypoglycemia shortly after birth are:
 hypothermia (Transient)
 polycythemia (Transient)
 hyperinsulinism (Recurrent)
 IEMs (Recurrent)
 Beckwith-Wiedmann syndrome (Recurrent)
 nesidioblastosis (Recurrent)
 Rh isoimmunization (Recurrent)
 Certain endocrine disorders (Recurrent)
 fetal hydrops
 Prematurity (Transient)
 congenital malformations
 small for gestational age (Transient)
 Large for gestational age (Transient)

Hyperinsulinism 
The most common cause on neonatal hypoglycemia is hyperinsulinism. Hyperinsulinism is also called persistent hyperinsulemic hypoglycemia of infancy (PHHI). This is seen very frequently to the neonates born from mothers with diabetes. Congenital hyperinsulinism is correlated with the abnormality of beta-cell regulation within the pancreas. Isolated islet adenoma, which is a focal disease, is often the cause of congenital hyperinsulism. Drug-induced hyperinsulisim is correlated with the administration insulin or use of hypoglycemic medication. In critical cases, a drug called Diazoxide is availed to stop any secretion of insulin.

Limited glycogen stores 
Limited glycogen storage occurs in premature newborns or newborns that had intrauterine growth retardation.

Increased glucose use 
Major causes of increased glucose use in a newborn include hyperthermia, polycythemia, sepsis, and growth hormone deficiency.

Decreased gluconeogenesis 
Two major issues that cause decreased gluconogeneis are inborn errors of metabolism and adrenal insufficiency.

Depeleted glycogen stores 
Most common causes of depleted glycogen stores are starvation and asphyxia-perinatal stress.

Mechanism 
There are many types of hypoglycemia, including transient and reoccurring. Each is associated with different risk factors and may have many underlying causes. Neonatal hypoglycemia occurs because an infants brain is dependent on a healthy supply of glucose. During the last trimester of pregnancy, glucose is stored in the liver, heart, and skeletal muscles. All newborns experience a physiological and transient fall in blood glucose, reaching a nadir at 2–3 hours of age before slowly rising over the next 24 hours. Newborns do have the ability to use an alternative form of energy, especially if breastfed. However, some newborns are only able to compensate this glucose deficiency up to a certain limit. Infants who have hyperinsulinism may increase the risk to develop hypoglycemia. There are other conditions that can increase the risk of an infant becoming hypoglycemic (See Risks).

Diagnosis 
Screening for hypoglycemia is done on every neonate on admission in the USA  but this is not recommended practice in all developed countries. One way of screening includes a heel stick to test the blood glucose level at the bedside. Diagnosing hypoglycemia in neonates requires two consecutive blood glucose readings of less than 40 mg/dL to properly diagnose hypoglycemia. Bedside glucose monitoring is only effective if the equipment is accurate, rapid, and reliable.  This form of testing is often faster and more cost effective.  Laboratory serum glucose testing is the most accurate way of testing blood glucose levels.  These specimens are either taken from the heel, arterial, or venous punctures and must be store immediately on ice in order to prevent glycolysis, further altering the results.  USA guidelines recommended that the hypoglycemic neonate should have a glucose test every 2–4 hours for the first 24 hours of life. Guidelines in the UK, however, recommend pre-feed screening of at-risk infants at 2–4 hours of age (to avoid false positives when blood glucose is, ordinarily, at its lowest at 2–3 hours of age) and at the subsequent feed until a blood glucose level of  >2.0 mmol/L (36 mg/dL) on at least two consecutive occasions and is feeding well.
1. Medical history
Maternal diabetes mellitus, gestational hypertension, neonatal erythrocytosis, neonatal haemolysis of incompatible blood groups, perinatal asphyxia, severe infection, sclerosis, neonatal respiratory distress syndrome, etc., especially in premature babies, babies younger than gestational age and those who are underfed in the early stages of life are at risk of neonatal hypoglycaemia.
2. Clinical manifestations
Neonatal hypoglycemia should be considered if there are atypical clinical manifestations, if the symptoms improve after glucose infusion, or if there are neurological symptoms and signs that cannot be easily explained.
3. Blood glucose measurement
Postnatal glucose monitoring is the main method of early detection of neonatal hypoglycaemia. In particular, children at risk of neonatal hypoglycaemia should have their blood glucose monitored within one hour of birth.

Management 
Some infants are treated with 40% dextrose (a form of sugar) gel applied directly to the infant's mouth. There are two main ways that neonatal hypoglycemia is treated.  The first way includes intravenous infusion of glucose.  For less severe, borderline, asymptomatic hypoglycemic neonates early introduction of breast milk can be effective for raising glucose levels to a healthy level.  Any infant at risk of hypoglycemia should have their blood sugar taken again one hour after birth.  Oral glucose is another option to restore normal glucose levels if the newborn is having difficulty latching to the breast or breastfeeding is not an option, however, breast milk is proven to be a better source as it includes glucose and carbohydrates.  It is recommended by The American Academy of Pediatrics that infants feed within the first hour of life with the glucose reading being 30 minutes after this feeding for an accurate result.  If the initial feeding does not raise the newborn's blood glucose above 40 mg/dL then the newborn must receive an IV infusion of 10% dextrose in water as a mini bolus as 2 mL/kg over 1 minute. Following the mini bolus a continuous infusion of 10% dextrose in water at 80-100 mL/kg/day in order to maintain a healthy serum glucose level between 40 and 50 mg/dL.  Maintaining newborn thermoregulation is a large part in preventing further hypoglycemia as well.

Nursing care management 

The biggest nursing concern for a neonate experiencing hypoglycemia is the physical assessment to potentially find the cause.  It is also essential to prevent environmental factors such as cold stress that may predispose the newborn for further decreasing blood sugar.  Within the physical assessment, comorbidities of hypoglycemia should also be assessed such as intolerance of feeding, or respiratory distress.  Another important nursing intervention is assisting the mother in successful breastfeeding as this can prevent and treat hypoglycemia.

If an IV infusion of 10% dextrose in water is initiated then the nurse must monitor for:

•Circulatory overload

•Hyperglycemia

•Glycosuria

•Intracellular dehydration

Outcomes 
Infants that experienced hypoglycemic episodes requiring treatment within the first few days of life have a higher chance of developing neurological or neurodevelopmental diagnoses than normoglycemic infants.  The severity of the effects resulting from the hypoglycemic episode depend on the length of the hypoglycemic episode and how low the neonate's blood glucose levels drop during the episode. Because glucose is an essential nutrient for the brain, untreated neonatal hypoglycemia causes irreversible damage to both the posterior occipital and cortex regions of the brain. These areas function in cognition, adaptability, and visual skills.
Long term complications of neonatal hypoglycemia may include:
 Neurologic damage that results in mental retardation
 Developmental delay
 Personality disorders
 Recurrent seizure activity
 Impaired cardiovascular function

Research 
Continuous glucose monitoring devices have been suggested to be helpful for improving blood glucose monitoring in neonatal infants, however, the devices have not been approved for use in this age group and the potential benefits and risks are not clear from available studies.

The taḥnīk also exercises the muscles of the mouth and helps with the circulation of blood in the mouth - this may help the baby to be able to suck and take mother's milk. It is also credited to prevent neonatal hypoglycemia in newborn babies.

See also
 Congenital hyperinsulinism
 Hyperinsulinemic hypoglycemia

References

Bibliography
 

Neonatology
Infancy
Infant feeding